CD63 antigen is a protein that, in humans, is encoded by the CD63 gene. CD63 is mainly associated with membranes of intracellular vesicles, although cell surface expression may be induced.

Function 

The protein encoded by this gene is a member of the transmembrane 4 superfamily, also known as the tetraspanin family. Most of these members are cell-surface proteins that are characterized by the presence of four hydrophobic domains. The proteins mediate signal transduction events that play a role in the regulation of cell development, activation, growth, and motility.
This encoded protein is a cell surface glycoprotein that is known to complex with integrins. It may function as a blood platelet activation marker. Deficiency of this protein is associated with  Hermansky-Pudlak Syndrome . Also this gene has been associated with tumor progression. The use of alternate polyadenylation sites has been found for this gene. Alternative splicing results in multiple transcript variants encoding different proteins.

Allergy diagnosis 

CD63 is a good marker for flow cytometric quantification of in vitro activated basophils for diagnosis of IgE-mediated allergy. The test is commonly designated as basophil activation test (BAT).

Research 

Initially, deletion and point mutants were used to investigate the role of the C-terminus, which contains a putative lysosomal-targeting/internalisation motif (GYEVM). C-terminal mutants showed increased surface expression and decreased intracellular localisation relative to CD63Wt. Antibody induced internalisation was reduced in C-terminal deletion mutants and abolished in G→A and Y→A mutants, showing the crucial role of these residues in internalisation.

CD63 is extensively and variably glycosylated and the EC2 region contain three potential N-linked glycosylation sites (N130, N150, and N172). Mutants N130A and N150A were similar to hCD63Wt with respect to intracellular localisation and internalisation. However, the hCD63N172A mutant showed a mainly cell surface localisation and low internalisation. Expression of a mutant lacking all three glycosylation sites was very unstable. It was speculated that the reduced internalisation of CD63N172A might be due to changes in its interaction with cell surface molecules. Immunoprecipitation experiments showed some evidence of a protein (100kDa) associating with CD63N172A, but this was not consistent. However, an association between CD63Wt and β2 integrin (CD18) was shown by co-internalisation of these proteins. Interactions with CD63 may therefore affect the trafficking and function of β2 integrins.

In cell biology, CD63 is often used as a marker for multivesicular bodies, which in some cells are enriched with CD63, as well as for extracellular vesicles released from either the multivesicular body or the plasma membrane.

Interactions 

CD63 has been shown to interact with CD117 and CD82.

See also 
 Cluster of differentiation

References

Further reading

External links 
 
 

Clusters of differentiation